Adirondack Hotel is a hotel in Long Lake, New York, located on New York State Route 30. It was built in the 1850s but it burnt down, and was rebuilt in 1900. 
The hotel has two verandas with a view of 14 miles of Long Lake.

Information
The Adirondack hotel is known for having two open verandas that have a direct view of the 14 miles of Long Lake. It also allows the viewer to see the surrounding mountains by the lake. Not only do the verandas overlook the lake, but the restaurants in the hotel also overlook Long Lake. The hotel also includes a gift shop for the convenience for the customers and visitors. The Adirondack taproom has a rustic look that allows the visitor to take a step back in time.  There was a point in time when the Adirondack hotel hosted a Murder Mystery Dinner.

Points of interest
The popular points of interest include the following:
Hikes and trails
Lake Eaton Trail	
Buttermilk Falls	
Kelly's Point, Northville-Lake Placid trail North	
Lower Sargent Pond to Marion river carry	
Sargent Pond Loop
Visitor's Interpretive Center in Newcomb	 
Owl's Head Mountain
Goodnow Mountain
Blue Mountain
Fishing
Sagamore Lake
Long Lake
Upper, Lower and Middle Sargent Ponds
Forked Lake
Newcomb Lake
Lake Lila
Big Brook
Public Beaches:
Sagamore Public Beach
Historic Sites
Blue Mountain Museum
Wild Center
Tourist Train - North Creek
Great Camp Sagamore
Santanoni Reserve
Buttermilk Falls
Adirondack High Peaks
Arts and crafts
Hoss' Country Store
Keller's Amish Gifts and Cheese
Upper Hudson Woolery, Newcomb
Betty's Funny Farm, Minerva
Adirondack Museum Shop, Blue Mountain Lake
Golf Courses
Newcomb Gold Course	
Indian Lake Golf Course	
Tupper Lake Golf Course	
Lake Placid Golf Course
Villages to explore
Lake George	
Lake Placid	
Saranac Lake	
Old Forge	
Warrensburg	
Santa's Workshop

Dining
For dining, guests can choose from the Victorian Dining Room or the Lake Street Cafe, both of which overlook Long Lake. There is also a bar in the Adirondack Taproom.

Notable Guests
People who are said to have stayed at the hotel include:
 John Wayne
 Mick Jagger

Gallery

References

External links
Official Site

Hotels in New York (state)
Hotels established in 1850
Hotel buildings completed in 1850
Hotel buildings completed in 1900
Buildings and structures in Hamilton County, New York